Robert John "Mutt" Lange (born 11 November 1948) is a South African record producer and songwriter, mainly known for his work in rock music as well as his previous marriage to Canadian singer Shania Twain, with whom he co-wrote and produced various songs. Her 1997 album Come On Over, which he produced, is the best-selling country music album, the best-selling studio album by a female act, the best-selling album of the 1990s, and the 9th best-selling album in the United States. He has also produced songs for, or otherwise worked with, artists such as AC/DC, Def Leppard, The Michael Stanley Band, The Boomtown Rats, Foreigner, Michael Bolton, The Cars, Bryan Adams, Huey Lewis and the News, Billy Ocean, Celine Dion, Britney Spears, The Corrs, Maroon 5, Lady Gaga, Now United,  Nickelback, and Muse.

Early life 

Robert John Lange was born in Mufulira, Northern Rhodesia (today Zambia), and raised in Durban, South Africa. His German mother came from a prosperous family, and his South African father was a mining engineer. Nicknamed "Mutt" at an early age, Lange grew up a fan of country music, in particular the singer Slim Whitman. While studying at Belfast High School in what is now Mpumalanga province, he started a band in which he played rhythm guitar and sang harmonies.

Career 

After his national service (1966–1967), Lange formed the band Sound Reason in 1969, together with James Borthwick, a South African TV, stage and film actor. In 1971, he started the group Hocus, recording one album and releasing five singles.

In 1978, Lange wrote and produced Ipswich Town's FA Cup final single "Ipswich Get That Goal", his connection with the club being due to their South Africa-born player Colin Viljoen. The song is derived from a previous recording "Give That Thang To Me" by Paul Jones (1977), with some parts rearranged and new lyrics.

Beginning production work in 1976, his first major hits came in October 1978 with the UK No. 1 single "Rat Trap" for The Boomtown Rats, followed in July 1979 with AC/DC's hard rock album Highway to Hell (#8 UK, No. 17 US). He produced a total of five albums for UK band City Boy from 1976 to 1979.

He produced two more albums with AC/DC, including Back in Black (1980), which is, the second-best-selling album of all time. He also worked with rock group Foreigner with 4, and with Def Leppard on their hit albums, High 'n' Dry, Pyromania, Hysteria and Adrenalize co-writing most of the songs.

After Hysteria, Lange bowed out of working with Def Leppard. In 1999, he returned to working with them in a more limited role, co-writing three tracks for their album Euphoria. One of those songs, "Promises", was a Number 1 hit on the mainstream rock charts for the band.

In 1991, he produced Bryan Adams's Waking Up the Neighbours, including co-writing "(Everything I Do) I Do It for You", for the Kevin Costner film Robin Hood: Prince of Thieves which, with 16 consecutive weeks at the top, from 7 July to 26 October 1991, holds the record for the longest number of consecutive weeks at Number 1 in the UK singles chart. Lange produced the single "Make You" from the album Great Escape by Irish singer Tara Blaise which was released in May 2008.

In the 2001 television film Hysteria – The Def Leppard Story, actor Anthony Michael Hall portrayed Lange.

Personal life 
Lange is a strict vegetarian and a follower of the egalitarian teachings of Sant Mat. He has not given an interview for decades and prefers to live a secluded life, primarily in La Tour-de-Peilz, Switzerland.

Lange met Stevie Vann when the two attended the same school in Northern Rhodesia in the early 1960s, and the two reconnected a few years later while attending Belfast High School in South Africa. They played together in a short-lived band named Hocus, and later married and emigrated to the United Kingdom in the 1970s. The marriage broke down in the 1970s. While still married, Lange started a five-year relationship with Oonagh O'Reilly, an Irish-born co-worker. In 1979 he married actress Olga Anthony.

After hearing Shania Twain's music, he got in touch with her and they spent many hours on the phone. They finally met six months after the initial contact and were married on 28 December 1993. Lange is a teetotaler and, as a result, they had non-alcoholic champagne at their wedding. Lange had the song "(Everything I Do) I Do It for You" performed as a sign of his dedication to Twain. In August 2001, their son Eja (pronounced "Asia") was born.

On 15 May 2008, a spokesman for his employer Mercury Nashville announced that Twain and Lange were separating, after Lange had an affair with Twain's then best friend and secretary, Marie-Anne Thiébaud, with whom he reportedly later began a relationship and moved to Switzerland. Lange and Twain divorced in June 2010. On 1 January 2011, Twain married Frédéric Thiébaud, the former husband of Marie-Anne.

In 2011, Lange purchased Coronet Peak Station located on the mountain and ski field of the same name in Queenstown, New Zealand. In 2014, he protected  of his land as Queen Elizabeth II National Trust covenant; this is the largest private conservation covenant in New Zealand.

Discography

Produced albums 
Albums on which Lange produced a majority of the tracks:
 Hocus – "The Swan"/"He", 1972
 Richard Jon Smith – Superstar Smith, 1974
 Spider – Spider, 1975
 City Boy – City Boy, 1976
 City Boy – Dinner at the Ritz, 1976
 Kevin Coyne – In Living Black and White, 1976
 Mallard – In a Different Climate, 1976
 Graham Parker – Heat Treatment, 1976
 Supercharge – Local Lads Make Good, 1976
 The Motors – 1, 1977
 City Boy – Young Men Gone West, 1977
 Clover – Love on the Wire, 1977
 Clover – Unavailable, 1977
 Supercharge – Horizontal Refreshment, 1977
 The Boomtown Rats – The Boomtown Rats, 1977
 The Rumour – Max, 1977
 Savoy Brown – Savage Return, 1978
 Michael Stanley Band – Cabin Fever, 1978
 City Boy – Book Early, 1978
 Outlaws – Playin' to Win, 1978
 The Boomtown Rats – A Tonic for the Troops, 1978
 Deaf School – English Boys/Working Girls, 1978
 City Boy – The Day the Earth Caught Fire, 1979
 The Records – Shades in Bed, 1979
 Supercharge – Body Rhythm, 1979
 The Boomtown Rats – The Fine Art of Surfacing, 1979
 AC/DC – Highway to Hell, 1979
 Tycoon – Tycoon, 1979
 Broken Home – Broken Home, 1980
 AC/DC – Back in Black, 1980
 Foreigner – 4, 1981
 Def Leppard – High 'N' Dry, 1981
 AC/DC – For Those About to Rock We Salute You, 1981
 Def Leppard – Pyromania, 1983
 The Cars – Heartbeat City, 1984
 Def Leppard – Hysteria, 1987
 Romeo's Daughter – Romeo's Daughter, 1988
 Billy Ocean – Tear Down These Walls, 1988
 Bryan Adams – Waking Up the Neighbours, 1991
 Def Leppard – Adrenalize (executive producer), 1992
 Michael Bolton – The One Thing, 1993
 Stevie Vann – Stevie Vann, 1995
 Shania Twain – The Woman in Me, 1995
 Bryan Adams – 18 til I Die, 1996
 Shania Twain – Come on Over, 1997
 The Corrs – In Blue, 2000
 Shania Twain – Up!, 2002
 Shania Twain – Greatest Hits, 2004
 Nickelback – Dark Horse, 2008
 Maroon 5 – Hands All Over, 2010
 Muse  – Drones, 2015
 Ashley Clark  – Ashley Clark, 2015

Produced album tracks 
Albums on which Lange produced at least one track:
 Jessica Jones – "Sunday, Monday, Tuesday", 1972
 Stephen – "Right On Running Man", 1974/5
 Graham Parker and the Rumour – The Parkerilla, 1978
 XTC – "This Is Pop" (single version), 1978
 Roman Holliday – Fire Me Up (executive producer), 1984
 Billy Ocean – Suddenly (executive producer), 1984
 Billy Ocean – Love Zone (executive producer), 1986
 Billy Ocean – Greatest Hits, 1989
 Bryan Adams – So Far So Good, 1993
 Tina Turner – What's Love Got to Do with It, 1993
 Michael Bolton – Greatest Hits, 1995
 Celine Dion – All the Way... A Decade of Song, 1999
 Backstreet Boys – Backstreet's Back, 1997
 Backstreet Boys – Millennium, 1999
 Bryan Adams – The Best of Me, 1999
 Def Leppard – Euphoria, 1999
 Britney Spears – Oops!... I Did It Again, 2000
 Celine Dion – A New Day Has Come, 2002
 Bryan Adams – Room Service, 2004
 Various artists – Music from and Inspired by Desperate Housewives, 2005
 Anne Murray – Anne Murray Duets: Friends & Legends, 2007
 Bryan Adams – 11, 2008
 Tara Blaise – Great Escape, 2008
 Lady Gaga – Born This Way, 2011
 Zander Bleck – Bring It On, 2012
Bryan Adams – So Happy It Hurts, 2022

Album tracks written or co-written 
 Britney Spears – "Don't Let Me Be the Last to Know" from Oops!...I Did It Again, 2000
 Bryan Adams – "I Will Always Return", "You Can't Take Me" and "This Is Where I Belong" from Spirit: Stallion of the Cimarron, 2002
 Bryan Adams – "So Far So Good" from Anthology, 2005
 Bryan Adams and Sarah McLachlan – "Don't Let Go" from Spirit: Stallion of the Cimarron, 2002
 Bryan Adams, Rod Stewart, and Sting – "All for Love" from The Three Musketeers: Original Motion Picture Soundtrack, 1993
Bryan Adams – "So Happy it Hurts" from So Happy It Hurts, 2021
Bryan Adams – "On The Road" from So Happy It Hurts, 2021
Bryan Adams – "Kick Ass" from So Happy It Hurts, 2021
 Jessica Andrews – "I'll Take Your Heart" from Heart Shaped World, 1999
 Backstreet Boys – "It's Gotta Be You" from Millennium, 1999
 Blackhawk – "I'm Not Strong Enough to Say No" from Strong Enough, 1995
 Michael Bolton – "Only a Woman Like You" from Only a Woman Like You, 2002
 Michael Bolton – "Said I Loved You...But I Lied" from The One Thing, 1993
 Clout – "Don't Stop" from Substitute, 1978
 Billy Ray Cyrus – "Only God (Could Stop Me Loving You)" from Storm in the Heartland, 1994
Celine Dion – "If Walls Could Talk", from: "All the Way... A Decade of Song", 1999
 Def Leppard – All songs on Pyromania, 1983
 Def Leppard – All songs on Hysteria, 1987
 Def Leppard – "Ring of Fire" and "I Wanna Be Your Hero" from Retro Active, 1993
 Def Leppard – "Promises", "All Night" and "It's Only Love" from Euphoria, 1999
 Dionne Warwick – "Without Your Love" – track produced by Richard Landis on album Finder of Lost Loves 1985
 Dobie Gray – "All I Wanna Do Is Make Love to You" from Dobie's self titled album, 1979
 Heart – "All I Wanna Do Is Make Love to You" & "Wild Child" from Brigade, 1990
 Heart – "Will You Be There (In the Morning)" from Desire Walks On, 1993
 Huey Lewis and the News – "Do You Believe in Love" from Picture This, 1982
 Huey Lewis and the News – "It Hit Me Like a Hammer" from Hard at Play, 1991
 Lonestar – "You Walked In" from Crazy Nights, 1997
 Loverboy – "Lovin' Every Minute of It" from Lovin' Every Minute of It, 1985
 Reba McEntire – "I'll Take Your Heart" from Moments and Memories: The Best of Reba, 1998
 Miss Willie Brown – "You're All That Matters to Me", 2012
 PJ Powers – "(Let That) River Roll" from Thandeka Talk to Me, 2001
 Starship – "I Didn't Mean to Stay All Night" from Love Among the Cannibals, 1989
 Carrie Underwood – "Who Are You" from Blown Away, 2012
 Celtic Woman – "Walk Beside Me", 2015
 Romeos Daughter – "Don't Break My Heart", "I Cry Myself to Sleep at Night", "Wild Child", "Heaven in the Backseat", 1988
 Eddie Money – "Heaven in the Backseat", 1991
 The Corrs – "Breathless", 2000
 Shania Twain – All songs on The Woman in Me (except "Leaving Is the Only Way Out"), Come on Over, and Up!
 Zander Bleck – "Bring It On", 2012
 Radioactive – "Move It", 2022

Grammy Awards 

 1991 – "(Everything I Do) I Do It for You" – Best Song Written Specifically for a Motion Picture or for Television
 1995 – The Woman in Me – Best Country Album
 1998 – "You're Still the One" – Best Country Song
 1999 – "Come on Over" – Best Country Song
 2016 – Drones – Best Rock Album

References

External links 
 

1948 births
Living people
APRA Award winners
British record producers
British songwriters
Country record producers
Grammy Award winners
British expatriates in New Zealand
English expatriates in Switzerland
Zambian people of German descent
Zambian people of South African descent
Zambian emigrants to the United Kingdom
Naturalised citizens of the United Kingdom
People from Mufulira
Musicians from London